Senator Brown may refer to:

Members of the Australian Senate
Bill Brown (Australian politician) (1920–2001), Senator for Victoria from 1969 to 1970 and 1971 to 1978
Bob Brown (born 1944), Senator for Tasmania from 1996 to 2012
Carol Brown (politician) (born 1963), Senator for Tasmania since 2005
Gordon Brown (Australian politician) (1885–1967), Senator for Queensland from 1932 to 1965

Members of the Canadian Senate
Albert Joseph Brown (1861–1938), Senator for Wellington, Quebec from 1932 to 1938
Bert Brown (1938–2018), Senator from Alberta from 2007 to 2013
George Brown (Canadian politician) (1818–1880), Senator for Lambton, Ontario from 1873 to 1880

Members of the Northern Irish Senate
Percival Brown (1901–1962), Northern Irish Senator from 1953 to 1955

Members of the United States Senate
Albert G. Brown (1813–1880), U.S. Senator from Mississippi from 1854 to 1861
Arthur Brown (U.S. senator) (1843–1906), U.S. Senator from Utah from 1896 to 1897
Benjamin Gratz Brown (1826–1885), U.S. Senator from Missouri from 1863 to 1867
Bedford Brown (1795–1870), U.S. Senator from North Carolina from 1829 to 1840
Ernest S. Brown (1903–1965), U.S. Senator from Nevada in 1954
Ethan Allen Brown (1776–1852), U.S. Senator from Ohio from 1822 to 1825
Fred H. Brown (1879–1955), U.S. Senator from New Hampshire from 1933 to 1939
Hank Brown (born 1940), U.S. Senator from Colorado from 1991 to 1997
James Brown (Louisiana politician) (1766–1835), U.S. Senator from Louisiana from 1813 to 1817 and from 1819 to 1823
John Brown (Kentucky politician, born 1757) (1757–1837), U.S. Senator from Kentucky from 1792 to 1805
Joseph E. Brown (1821–1894), U.S. Senator from Georgia from 1880 to 1891
Michael Donald Brown (born 1953), U.S. Shadow Senator from the District of Columbia since 2007
Muriel Humphrey Brown (1912–1998), U.S. Senator from Minnesota in 1978
Norris Brown (1863–1960), U.S. Senator from Nebraska from 1907 to 1913
Prentiss M. Brown (1889–1973), U.S. Senator from Michigan from 1936 to 1943
Scott Brown (politician) (born 1959), U.S. Senator from Massachusetts from 2010 to 2013
Sherrod Brown (born 1952), U.S. Senator from Ohio since 2006

United States state senate members
Aaron V. Brown (1795–1859), Tennessee State Senate
Adon P. Brown (1873–1942), New York State Senate
Arnold M. Brown (born 1931), South Dakota State Senate
Basil W. Brown (1927–1997), Michigan State Senate
Bill Brown (American politician) (born 1944), Oklahoma State Senate
Bob Brown (Montana politician) (born 1947), Montana State Senate
Byron Brown (born 1958), New York State Senate
Cameron S. Brown (born 1954), Michigan State Senate
Charles Elwood Brown (1834–1904), Ohio State Senate
Charles Brown (congressman) (1797–1883), Pennsylvania
Chris A. Brown (born 1964), New Jersey State Senate
Cora Brown (1914–1972), Michigan State Senate
Corey Brown (politician) (born 1974), South Dakota State Senate
Dan W. Brown (1950–2021), Missouri State Senate
Darius J. Brown (fl. 2010s), Delaware State Senate
Dave Brown (Minnesota politician) (born 1961), Minnesota State Senate
Dwight A. Brown (1918–1990), Maine State Senate
Edgar Allan Brown (1888–1975), South Carolina
Edna Brown (born 1940), Ohio State Senate
Elias Brown (1793–1857), Maryland State Senate
Elon R. Brown (1857–1922), New York State Senate
Garry E. Brown (1923–1998), Michigan State Senate
George L. Brown (1926–2006), Colorado State Senate
Harry Brown (American politician) (born 1955), North Carolina State Senate
Jack A. Brown (1929–2015), Arizona State Senate
Jason B. Brown (1839–1898), Indiana State Senate
John Brewer Brown (1836–1898), Maryland State Senate
Joseph A. Brown (1903–1963), Michigan State Senate
Kate Brown (born 1960), Oregon State Senate
Kenneth Francis Brown (1919–2014), Hawaii State Senate
Leanna Brown (1935–2016), New Jersey State Senate
Lisa Brown (Washington politician) (born 1956), Washington State Senate
Liz Brown (politician) (fl. 2000s–2010s), Indiana State Senate
Lori Lipman Brown (born 1958), Nevada State Senate
Napoleon Bonaparte Brown (1834–1910), Kansas State Senate
Neal Brown (Wisconsin politician) (1861–1917), Wisconsin State Senate
Orlando Brown (Wisconsin politician) (1828–1910), Wisconsin State Senate
Pam Brown (politician) (1952–2011), Nebraska State Senate
Robert Brown (Georgia politician) (1950–2011), Georgia State Senate
Robert Brown (Pennsylvania politician) (1744–1823), Pennsylvania State Senate
Ron Brown (Wisconsin politician) (born 1946), Wisconsin State Senate
Roy Brown (Montana politician) (born 1951), Montana State Senate
Rufus E. Brown (1854–1920), Vermont State Senate
Sam H. Brown (fl. 1930s), Oregon State Senate
Samuel Brown (Oregon politician) (1821–1886), Oregon State Senate
Sharon Brown (Washington politician) (fl. 2010s), Washington State Senate
Taylor G. Brown (1890–1957), Wisconsin State Senate
Taylor Brown (Montana politician) (fl. 2000s–2010s), Montana State Senate
Terry W. Brown (1950–2014), Mississippi State Senate
Thomas C. Brown (1870–1952), New York State Senate
Titus Brown (1786–1849), New Hampshire State Senate
Troy E. Brown (born 1971), Louisiana State Senate
Walt Brown (politician) (born 1926), Oregon State Senate
Walter L. Brown (1846–1924), New York State Senate
Warren Brown (politician) (1836–1919), New Hampshire State Senate
William Denis Brown III (1931–2012), Louisiana State Senate
William L. Brown (politician) (1840–1906), New York State Senate
William M. Brown (Pennsylvania politician) (1850–1915), Pennsylvania State Senate

See also
Angela Brown-Burke, Senate of Jamaica
Ginny Brown-Waite (born 1943), Florida State Senate
Senator Browne (disambiguation)